= The Children of Prescott Hall Butler =

Sculpture by Augustus Saint-Gaudens

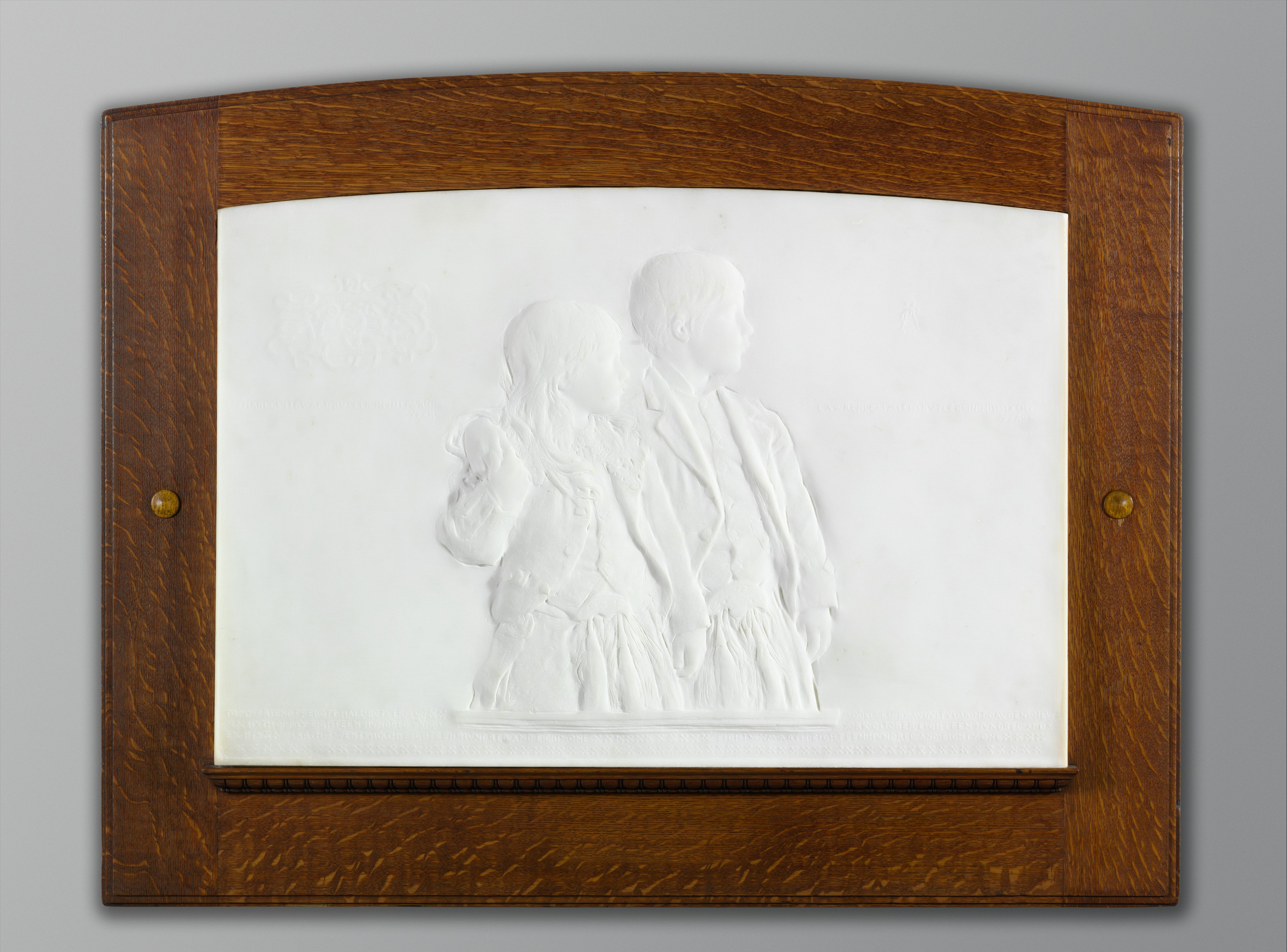
- Artist: Augustus Saint-Gaudens
- Type: Sculpture
- Medium: Marble
- Location: Metropolitan Museum of Art; New York City, New York

The Children of Prescott Hall Butler is a marble sculpture by Augustus Saint-Gaudens. It was designed during 1880–1881 and carved during 1906–1907. The sculpture is part of the collection of the Metropolitan Museum of Art.
